The Stubbs–Ballah House in Norfolk in Madison County, Nebraska, USA, was built in 1917. It was listed on the National Register of Historic Places in 2013.

It was designed by the architect James C. Stitt.

References

Houses on the National Register of Historic Places in Nebraska
Art Deco architecture in Nebraska
Houses completed in 1917
Houses in Madison County, Nebraska
National Register of Historic Places in Madison County, Nebraska